Eva Brezalieva (born 13 January 2005 in Burgas, Bulgaria) is a Bulgarian individual rhythmic gymnast. She is the 2020 European junior bronze medalist with rope. On national level, she is the 2019 Bulgarian Junior All-Around bronze medalist.

Career

Junior
She competed at the 2019 Bulgarian Junior National Championships where she won bronze medal in All-around and Clubs final, and silver medal in Ball final. She competed at the 2019 Junior World Championships in Moscow, Russia where she placed 8th in Team competition and 6th in Rope qualifications.

In 2020, she became Bulgarian Junior National champion with Rope and won silver medal with Ball. She competed at the International Tournament in Moscow, where she and her teammate Stiliana Nikolova tok 2nd place in Team competition. She also won silver medal with Rope and Ball and bronze medal with Ribbon. She competed at the 2020 Junior European Championships in Kyiv, Ukraine and qualified to two apparatus finals. She won bronze medal in Rope final.

Senior 
She started the 2022 season by competing at the rhythmic gymnastics world cup in Athens, Greece, where she took bronze medal in Ribbon final. At World Challenge Cup Portimão, she won bronze medal in All-around.

Routine music information

References

External links 
 

Living people
2005 births
Sportspeople from Burgas
Bulgarian rhythmic gymnasts
Competitors at the 2022 World Games